"What's the Frequency, Kenneth?" is a song by American alternative rock band R.E.M. from their ninth studio album, Monster (1994). The song's title refers to an incident in New York City in 1986, when two then-unknown assailants attacked journalist Dan Rather, while repeating "Kenneth, what is the frequency?"

The song was the first single taken from the album and was released on September 5, 1994. It peaked at number 21 on the US Billboard Hot 100, number 2 in Canada, number 4 in New Zealand, and number 9 on the UK Singles Chart. In Iceland, it peaked at number 1 for four weeks. It was the first song to debut at number one on the Billboard Modern Rock Tracks chart.

"What's the Frequency, Kenneth?" was placed on R.E.M.'s compilation albums In Time: The Best of R.E.M. 1988–2003 in 2003 and Part Lies, Part Heart, Part Truth, Part Garbage 1982–2011 in 2011, the only track from Monster to feature on either. The song was one of the band's most-played songs at live gigs, and was played at every show on their 2008 Accelerate tour. A live version was released on R.E.M. Live in 2007.

History

Background and recording
R.E.M. began work on Monster in August 1993 and "What's the Frequency, Kenneth?" was realized about two months later in October. This song was written and recorded at Kingsway Studio, New Orleans, where the band also wrote and recorded "Tongue" and "Crush with Eyeliner". Lead singer Michael Stipe has said in interviews that the lyrics are about the Generation X phenomenon in contemporary mass media, sung in character as an older critic whose information consists exclusively of media products.

Guitarist Peter Buck explained why the song slows towards its conclusion in an interview with Guitar World magazine:

Post-release
"What's The Frequency, Kenneth?" made its first live television debut on November 12, 1994, for Saturday Night Live, recorded at NBC Studios in New York City. The set on the show opened with "What's the Frequency, Kenneth?" and was followed by two other songs from the new album, Monster, "Bang and Blame" and "I Don't Sleep, I Dream". The following year, on June 22, 1995, at Madison Square Garden in New York City, Dan Rather accompanied the band during a soundcheck performance of the song. The clip was shown prior to R.E.M.'s performance of "Crush with Eyeliner" on the Late Show with David Letterman the following night.

Critical reception
Steve Baltin from Cash Box felt that "What's the Frequency, Kenneth?" is "a strong song, but it’s not as much a single as the introduction to the most eagerly anticipated record of the fall. On that level, it’s a smashing success. The song literally explodes onto the airwaves with an updated version of classic guitar rock before the booming of the drums takes the song into Michael Stipe’s unique vocals. From there, the track weaves its way through various rock tempos without ever losing the momentum from its initial burst of energy." Chuck Campbell from Knoxville News Sentinel remarked that Buck's "powerful-but-not-grungy guitar" is the centerpiece on the "satisfying" first single. Pan-European magazine Music & Media wrote, "Are they losing their religion? Radically breaking with the tradition of their last semi-acoustic CDs, R.E.M. give a first taste of the "heavy Monstersound" of the new one." 

Alan Jones of Music Week found that it is "the most straightforward rock song the group has done in years, a full-throttle aural assault and very intense. With bonus live tracks, this one will sell." Paul Evans from Rolling Stone declared it as "R.E.M.'s toughest single". Howard Hampton from Spin commented that it "lifts its catch phrase from the dadaist mugger who attacked Dan Rather a few years back. The song, wryly straddling the pop-irony curtain dividing Reservoir Dogs from stupid-pet MC David Letterman, revels in a nagging resonance that signifies nothing, but wants to say everything."

Music video
Shot in Hollywood, California, in August 1994, the accompanying music video for "What's the Frequency, Kenneth?" was directed by Peter Care, who had previously worked with the band on music videos for "Drive" and "Man on the Moon" in 1992. It features the band playing along to the song under bright blue, red, yellow and green flashing lights. Michael Stipe appears timid behind the microphone until the first chorus, breaking into an energetic dance. Prominent in the guitar solo, Peter Buck uses Kurt Cobain's Jag-Stang that he received as a gift from Courtney Love after Cobain died; he plays it upside-down as Cobain was left-handed. Singer Stipe's newly shaven head and bassist Mike Mills's new look (long-hair and the use of Nudie suits), prominent on the 1995 Monster world tour, were given wide exposure in this video. The suit seen in the music video was owned by musician Gram Parsons.

The DVD companion to In Time, entitled In View: The Best of R.E.M. 1988–2003 (featuring the promotional videos to most of the songs from In Time), included the music video to "What's the Frequency, Kenneth?".

Track listings
All songs were written by Bill Berry, Peter Buck, Mike Mills, and Michael Stipe. The live recordings of "Monty Got a Raw Deal", "Everybody Hurts" and "Man on the Moon" were recorded at the 40 Watt Club, Athens, Georgia on November 19, 1992. The performance—a benefit for Greenpeace—was recorded in a solar-powered mobile studio.

US CD and cassette single
 "What's the Frequency, Kenneth?"  – 3:59
 "What's the Frequency, Kenneth?" (instrumental version)  – 3:59

UK 7-inch and cassette single
 "What's the Frequency, Kenneth?"  – 3:59
 "What's the Frequency, Kenneth?" (K version)  – 3:59

UK, European, Australian, and Japanese CD single
 "What's the Frequency, Kenneth?"  – 3:59
 "Monty's Got a Raw Deal" (live)  – 4:22
 "Everybody Hurts" (live)  – 5:41
 "Man on the Moon" (live)  – 5:24

Charts

Weekly charts

Year-end charts

Certifications

References

External links
 What's the Frequency, Kenneth?. Songfacts.com.

1994 singles
R.E.M. songs
Number-one singles in Iceland
Songs written by Bill Berry
Songs written by Peter Buck
Songs written by Mike Mills
Songs written by Michael Stipe
Warner Records singles
Songs based on actual events
Song recordings produced by Scott Litt
Song recordings produced by Michael Stipe
Song recordings produced by Mike Mills
Song recordings produced by Bill Berry
Song recordings produced by Peter Buck
Glam rock songs
Grunge songs
1994 songs
American garage rock songs